Ed and his son George Hartley were lynched in Camden, Benton County, Tennessee by a mob on October 20, 1922. According to the United States Senate Committee on the Judiciary they were the 54th and 55th of 61 lynchings during 1922 in the United States. The two were the only lynchings in the state of Tennessee and of the 61 lynchings they were 2 of 6 white victims.

Background
Ed and his son George Hartley were being held in connection with the manslaughter of Connie Hartley, nephew of Ed Hartley in Benton County, Tennessee. On February 20, 1922, Connie Hartley and his father John Hartley were cutting wood ties near Harmon Creek when they were fired upon.  Connie "Con" Hartley was killed instantly. His father, John Hartley, was seriously wounded and was on death's door for several days. On September 22, 1922, Ed and George were convicted of voluntary manslaughter in the Benton County circuit court. During the same trial, Vuid Hartley (the son of Ed Hartley) and Bill Conley (a local boy) were acquitted of the voluntary manslaughter charge. 

On October 20, 1922, Ed and George Hartley were in the Benton County jail, in Camden, filing a motion for a new trial.

Lynching 
Sheriff E.G. Flowers was on duty in the Camden jail when he heard a knock at the door around midnight on October 20, 1922. When he opened the door he was overwhelmed by a mob of 20-50 people with black stockings pulled over their heads and eye holes cut out. While Sheriff Flowers didn't give up the keys the men of the mob quickly found where they were kept. The mob dragged Ed and George from their cell but not without a fight. At the Hugh Bivens undertakers, a post-mortem showed that Ed's arm was broken in the struggle and George was hit with a blunt object causing heavy bruising to his head. Vuid Hartley (the son of Ed Hartley) and Bill Conley who were in another cell were left alone. Ed's corpse was naked with his clothes stripped off him.

The family took possession of the bodies on Friday, October 20, 1922, hundreds of people viewed the bodies during the funeral. The next day they were buried at the Phifer graveyard.

See also
List of lynchings in the United States in 1922

Bibliography 
Notes
  

 - Total pages: 136

1922 riots
1922 in Tennessee 
Lynching deaths in Tennessee 
October 1922 events
Protest-related deaths 
Riots and civil disorder in Tennessee 
White American riots in the United States
1922 murders in the United States